Hyalomma marginatum is a hard-bodied tick found on birds including the pale crag martin. This tick has been implicated in the transmission of Bahig virus, a pathogenic arbovirus previously thought to be transmitted only by mosquitoes.

The Crimean-Congo Hemorrhagic Fever virus has also been detected in ticks of this type removed from migratory birds in Morocco.

Hyalomma marginatum marginatum is a subspecies.
The subspecies is typically found in northern Africa, southern Europe and some parts of Asia. 
It was also identified in Germany in 2006. It is found in Norway.

References 

Ixodidae
Parasites of birds
Arachnids of Africa
Arachnids of Asia
Arachnids of Europe
Invertebrates of North Africa
Animals described in 1844
Taxa named by Carl Ludwig Koch